A number of ships have been named Umvoti, including:

 , a British cargo ship in service 1925–40
 , a British cargo ship in service 1957–59

Ship names